The SNCF Class X 4500 diesel multiple units were built by ANF between 1963–1970. The X4500 class are one of four classes of similar design (X4300, X4500, X4630, X4750) known as "Caravelles". This name comes from when built the engine sound reminded railwaymen of the contemporary French SE210 'Caravelle' jet airliner. 
X4500 are identical to the earlier Class X4300 except for having a different engine. The motor cars operate with unpowered trailers from either class XR8300 or XR8500 depending on seating demand. The class has now been withdrawn, some being sold to other countries such as Romania (used by Regiotrans and Via Terra). 
The last examples in France (14 as at April 2009) worked around Burgundy (Nevers depot).

Usage
The class was used across France on regional services.

Preserved units
A number of the class have been preserved with organisations in France.

 X 4506, CFT Viaduc 07 
 X 4545, Train du pays Cathare et du Fenouillèdes (TPCF).
 X 4554, TPCF.
 X 4567, Train touristique du centre-Var (ATTCV).
 X 4573, TPCF.
 X 4590, ATTCV.
 X 4607, TPCF.
 X 4620, Chemin de fer touristique de la Sarthe (Tansvap).

RegioTrans
The following units have seen further use in Romania with the company Regiotrans.

 X 4504
 X 4512
 X 4515
 X 4520
 X 4522
 X 4534
 X 4542
 X 4546
 X 4553
 X 4564
 X 4565
 X 4571
 X 4572
 X 4578
 X 4587
 X 4600
 X 4606
 X 4624
 X 4626

References

4500
Diesel multiple units of France